Laolestes is an extinct genus of dryolestid mammal. Fossil remains are known from the Morrison Formation, in stratigraphic zones 5 and 6., the Late Jurassic of Portugal, and Early Cretaceous Wadhurst Clay of the United Kingdom.

See also

 Prehistoric mammal
 List of prehistoric mammals
 Paleobiota of the Morrison Formation

References

Dryolestida
Late Jurassic mammals of Europe
Early Cretaceous mammals of Europe
Tithonian genus first appearances
Berriasian genera
Valanginian genus extinctions
Fossil taxa described in 1927
Prehistoric mammal genera